Pir-e Gavgol (also Romanized as Pīr-e Gāvgol and Pirgāvgol; also known as Pargāvgol, Parkāgol, and Pīrgojil) is a village in Khararud Rural District, in the Central District of Khodabandeh County, Zanjan Province, Iran. At the 2006 census, its population was 203, in 49 families.

References 

Populated places in Khodabandeh County

...